Jenna Leigh Challenor (born 6 July 1981) is a South African long-distance runner. She competed in the marathon event at the 2017 World Championships in Athletics in London, UK, finishing 59th.

Her personal best times are 1:14:19 in the half marathon (2014); and 2:36:50 in the marathon (2020).

See also
 South Africa at the 2017 World Championships in Athletics

References

1981 births
Living people
South African female long-distance runners
South African female marathon runners
Place of birth missing (living people)